Rachel Cook may refer to:

Rachael Leigh Cook (born 1979), American actress
Rachel Scott (women's education reformer) (1848–1905), Scottish reformer